Crossfire is a series of video games that mainly feature tactical first-person shooter games. The series was created by Smilegate and debuted on  Microsoft Windows; it has expanded to other genres and platforms.

Gameplay
The series is mainly known for its search-and-destroy objective-based modes. Players on one side of a map try to plant a bomb, while the other teams tries to defend the bombsites or disable the bomb.

Games

Main series

Crossfire 

Crossfire, the first game in the series, was released for Microsoft Windows on May 3, 2007. The game was multiplayer focused with no single-player campaign. The game is one of the most played first person shooters in the world.

Crossfire HD
Crossfire HD is a free spin-off first-person shooter PC game set to be released exclusively for China. This game has been described as a remastered version of the original Crossfire using Unreal Engine 3. Crossfire HD went into a fourth closed beta in China in August 2020. Crossfire HD has officially been released to the public on the 10th June 2021 only in China.

Crossfire Zero
Crossfire Zero was a free spin-off first-person shooter PC game for the Southeast Asian market released in January 2020. This game featured two game modes, one which offered classic modes such as S&D and Team Death Match and the other offering a Battle Royale style mode. The game ran on Unity and has been closed on the 28th October 2020.

CrossfireX

CrossfireX is a first-person shooter released exclusively for Xbox One and Xbox Series X/S. Smilegate Entertainment wanted to expand the narrative of the franchise and introduce it to a broader audience. Therefore, the team partnered with Xbox Game Studios to create a console version and entrusted Remedy Entertainment, a Finnish video game developer, to create a single-player campaign for the game. As Remedy at that time was exploring the idea of working on a first-person shooter, and planned on developing multiple projects at once, the team agreed to help Smilegate. Remedy had been working on the single-player portion since 2016. The single-player portion will be powered by Remedy's own Northlight engine, which was used previously in Quantum Break and Control. Remedy was chosen due to the team's expertise in creating memorable fictional worlds and characters. Inspired by Metal Gear Solid and Resident Evil, the team hoped to create characters that are "larger-than-life".

Crossfire: Sierra Squad
Crossfire: Sierra Squad is an upcoming first-person shooter developed and published by Smilegate for PlayStation 5's virtual reality headset PlayStation VR2. The game is expected to be released in 2023.

Spin-off games

Crossfire Mobile
Crossfire Mobile (also known as Crossfire: Legends) is a free application for mobile users to play a separate Crossfire experience on the go; while maintaining the overall aesthetic of the original game. The application is developed by Smilegate and Tencent. The game is running on Unity and was released on December 3 (2015) for iOS and Android devices to all markets. The game is now only operating in China as other markets have been closed.

Crossfire: Warzone
Crossfire: Warzone is a spin-off real-time strategy mobile game, for iOS and Android mobile devices. It was developed by Joycity, and released on July 28, 2020.

Crossfire: Legion

Crossfire: Legion is a real-time strategy video game developed by Blackbird Interactive and published by Prime Matter and Smilegate for Windows PC. The game was released through early access on May 24, 2022, and fully on September 8, 2022.

Other media

Film adaptation
In October 2015, it was announced that Neal Moritz would be producing a film version of Crossfire, after spending a year weighing up proposals from Hollywood producers and studios. A year later, Chuck Hogan was announced to be in charge of writing the script.

In February 2020, it was announced that Sony Pictures will be developing the film adaptation, Tencent Pictures will co-produce and co-finance and Moritz will produce through his Original Film banner.

Television drama
Crossfire, a Chinese television drama series produced by Youhug Media and Tencent Holdings, premiered on July 20, 2020. The plot is a coming-of-age story about two young Crossfire gamers, played by Chinese movie stars Lu Han and Leo Wu, attempting to compete in Crossfire e-sports competitions. The show became a commercial success, receiving more than  views on online streaming platforms within four weeks of release. , the show has received more than  views in China.

References

 
First-person shooters
Video game franchises
Video game franchises introduced in 2007